Early Branch is an unincorporated community in Hampton County, South Carolina, United States. Early Branch has a post office with ZIP code 29916.

References

Unincorporated communities in Hampton County, South Carolina
Unincorporated communities in South Carolina